Ivan Ivanovich Zarubin (27 September 1887 – 3 February 1964) was a Soviet specialist of Iranian languages, particularly Pamir languages.

Life
Zarubin was born in 1887. He wrote dozens of books on Iranian languages and was the leading authority in the Soviet Union of the Pamir languages spoken in Gorno-Badakhshan Autonomous Oblast in the Tajik SSR. He was a professor at Leningrad University, a position he held until 1949, and was director of the Department of the Near East and Central Asia at the Kunstkamera in Leningrad.

In the summer of 1914, Zarubin, together with a French Iranist Robert Gauthiot, traveled to the Pamir Mountains and conducted linguistic and ethnographic research. Over the coming decades, Zarubin continued to conduct linguistic, folkloric and ethnographic studies in the Pamirs and elsewhere in Central Asia. One of his greatest achievements was the 1926–30 Central Asian ethnological expedition on behalf of the Academy of Sciences.

A large portion of the Pamir collection at the Kunstkamera's Department of the Near East and Central Asia was acquired during Zarubin's work in the Pamirs in 1914. Zarubin usually published his works under the named I. I. Zarubin.

Zarubin died in 1964.

Selected bibliography

 , 1925.
  S.S.S.R., 1926.
 , 1926.
 , 1927.
 , 1927.
 , 1927.
 , 1927.
  = , 1927.
  = , 1928.
 , 1930, no. 5.
 . Leningrad: , 1930.
 . Leningrad: , 1932.
 . Publisher: Leningrad, 1932. co-written with Daniil Zatočnik.
 Two Yazghulāmī Texts. Bulletin of the School of Oriental Studies, University of London, 1936, vol. 8, no. 2/3, pp. 875-881.
 , 1937.
 , 1960.
 , 1963.
 . Donetsk, 1969.
 , 1974.
 , 1983. co-written with Vladimir Michajlovič Blinov and Ch P Neškov.

References

External links
 Ivan Ivanovich Zarubin - The Great Soviet Encyclopedia

Linguists from the Soviet Union
20th-century linguists
Iranologists
Russian orientalists
1887 births
1964 deaths